Davydikha is a rural locality (a village) in Velikodvorskoye Rural Settlement, Totemsky  District, Vologda Oblast, Russia. The population was 29 as of 2002.

Geography 
Davydikha is located 48 km south of Totma (the district's administrative centre) by road. Veliky Dvor is the nearest rural locality.

References 

Rural localities in Tarnogsky District